Maciej Pryczek (born 29 April 1976) is a Polish short track speed skater. He competed in two events at the 1998 Winter Olympics.

References

1976 births
Living people
Polish male short track speed skaters
Olympic short track speed skaters of Poland
Short track speed skaters at the 1998 Winter Olympics
Sportspeople from Gliwice